Obtusipalpis is a genus of moths of the family Crambidae described by George Hampson in 1896.

Species
Obtusipalpis albidalis Hampson, 1919
Obtusipalpis brunneata Hampson, 1919
Obtusipalpis citrina Druce, 1902
Obtusipalpis fusipartalis Hampson, 1919
Obtusipalpis pardalis Hampson, 1896
Obtusipalpis rubricostalis Marion, 1954

References

Spilomelinae
Crambidae genera
Taxa named by George Hampson